Thomas Ballard (fl. 1388), was an English Member of Parliament.

He was a Member (MP) of the Parliament of England for Reigate in February 1388. Nothing more is recorded of him.

References

14th-century births
Year of death missing
14th-century English people
People from Reigate
Members of the Parliament of England (pre-1707)